The 1972–73 FC Bayern Munich season was the club's eighth season in Bundesliga.

Team kit

Match results

Legend

Bundesliga

DFB-Pokal

DFB-Ligapokal

European Cup

References

FC Bayern Munich seasons
Bayern
German football championship-winning seasons